Libertarianism in the United Kingdom can either refer to a political movement synonymous with anarchism, left-libertarianism and libertarian socialism, or to a political movement concerned with the pursuit of propertarian right-libertarian ideals in the United Kingdom which emerged and became more prominent in British politics after the 1980s neoliberalism and the economic liberalism of the premiership of Margaret Thatcher, albeit not as prominent as libertarianism in the United States in the 1970s and the presidency of Republican Ronald Reagan during the 1980s.

Currently, the most explicitly libertarian party in the United Kingdom is the Libertarian Party. However, there has also been a long-standing right-libertarian faction of the mainstream Conservative Party that espouses Thatcherism. UK voters have tended to vote more in line with their position along the traditional 'left-right’ division rather than along libertarian-authoritarian lines, and so libertarians in the United Kingdom have supported parties across the political spectrum.

Political parties

Libertarian parties 
The Libertarian Party is the main libertarian party within the United Kingdom describing itself as being a "Classically Liberal, Regionalist and Minarchist organisation". The Liberal Party was formed in 1989 from those opposed to the merger between the Liberal Party and the Social Democratic Party. The Scottish Libertarian Party was formed as a separate party in 2012 and officially registered in 2014. It was statutorily deregistered on 11 November 2022 for failing to meet Electoral Commission requirements

Relationship with the Conservative Party 
Libertarianism, and particularly right-libertarianism, became more prominent in British politics after the promotion of neoliberalism and economic liberalism under the premiership of Margaret Thatcher. Since the 1980s, a number of Conservative MPs have been considered to have libertarian leanings, and libertarian groups have been perceived to exert considerable influence over the Party.

However, in her first Conservative Party conference speech as leader, Theresa May attacked the "libertarian right" and argued for a more pro-state communitarian conservatism. In recent years, Conservative Party policy has appeared to move further away from libertarianism,
 and a smaller proportion of their support has come from voters with libertarian attitudes.

Relationship with the Green Party of England and Wales 
Sociologist Chris Rootes stated that the Green Party took "the left-libertarian" vote, while Dennison and Goodwin characterised it as reflecting "libertarian-universalistic values". The party wants an end to big government – which they see as hindering open and transparent democracy – and want to limit the power of big business – which, they argue, upholds the unsustainable trend of globalisation, and is detrimental to local trade and economies. There have been allegations of factionalism and infighting in the Green Party between liberal, socialist, and anarchist factions.

Relationship with the UK Independence Party 
As leader of the Eurosceptic UK Independence Party (UKIP), Nigel Farage sought to broaden the public perception of the UKIP beyond being a party solely seeking to withdraw the United Kingdom from the European Union to one of being a party broadly standing for libertarian values and reductions in government bureaucracy. The party describes itself as a "libertarian, non-racist Eurosceptic party".

Criticism 
UKIP's original activist base was largely "libertarian", supporting an economically liberal approach. Its "economic libertarian" views have been influenced by classical liberalism and Thatcherism, with Thatcher representing a key influence on UKIP's thought. Farage has characterised UKIP as "the true inheritors" of Thatcher, claiming that the party never would have formed had Thatcher remained Prime Minister of the UK throughout the 1990s. Winlow, Hall, and Treadwell suggested that a UKIP government would pursue "hard-core Thatcherism" on economic policy. UKIP presents itself as a "libertarian party", and the political scientists David Deacon and Dominic Wring described it as articulating "a potent brand of libertarian populism". However, commentators writing in The Spectator, The Independent, and the New Statesman have all challenged the description of UKIP as libertarian, highlighting its socially conservative and economically protectionist policies as being contrary to a libertarian ethos.

In 2010, the UKIP's call to ban the burkha in public places was criticised by Shami Chakrabarti as contrary to libertarianism.

Prominent libertarians 

Prominent British libertarians have included:
 Bill Etheridge (born 1970) defected from the UK Independence Party to the Libertarian Party in 2018, becoming Deputy Chair, before defecting to the Brexit Party in 2019
 Sean Gabb (born 1960) director of the Libertarian Alliance from 2006–2017
 Peter Thomas Bauer (1915–2002), developmental economist and 2002 winner of the Cato Institute's Milton Friedman Prize
 Alan Duncan (born 1957), Conservative politician
 Daniel Hannan (born 1971), Conservative politician
 Andrew Marr (born 1959), journalist and political commentator
 Friedrich Hayek (1899–1992), economist and author
 Herbert Spencer (1820–1903), philosopher
 Chris Tame (1949–2006), co-founder of the Libertarian Alliance
 Douglas Carswell (born 1971), UK Independence Party politician
 David Davis (born 1948), Brexit Secretary and Conservative politician

See also 

 Anarchism in the United Kingdom
 Classical liberalism
 Diggers
 Levellers
 Libertarianism in South Africa
 Libertarianism in the United States
 Radicalism (historical)

References

Bibliography 

 
 
 
 
 
 
 
 
 
 

 
United Kingdom